Nucras livida, the  Karoo sandveld lizard, is a species of wall lizard in the family of true lizards (Lacertidae). It is found in Namibia and South Africa.

References 

Nucras
Lacertid lizards of Africa
Reptiles described in 1838
Taxa named by Andrew Smith (zoologist)